SBT may refer to:

In entertainment and media
 Sistema Brasileiro de Televisão (Brazilian Television System), a Brazilian TV network
 South Bend Tribune newspaper, and its associated broadcast stations:
 WSBT (AM)
 WSBT-TV
 Sym-Bionic Titan, an American animated series created by Genndy Tartakovsky for Cartoon Network

In science, technology, and medicine
 sbt (software), source build tool for the Scala programming language
 2-sec-Butyl-4,5-dihydrothiazole, a thiazoline ligand
 Small bowel transplantation, a transplant surgery
 Spontaneous breathing trial, abbreviation used in medical documents
 Session-based testing, a software test method combining accountability and exploratory testing

Other uses
 Scan-based trading, an inventory system
 Single-bullet theory, a theory on some aspects of John F. Kennedy's assassination
 Southern bluefin tuna, a species of tuna
 Special Boat Teams, a unit under U.S. Naval Special Warfare Command
 Staffordshire Bull Terrier, a breed of dog
 State Bank of Travancore, a bank in India
 Swedish Bikini Team, a group of American female models
 Sweetened beverage tax